Narasimha, sometimes rendered Narasingha, is the fourth avatar of the Hindu god Vishnu. He is regarded to have incarnated in the form of a part-lion, part-man being to slay Hiranyakashipu, to end religious persecution and calamity on earth, thereby restoring dharma. Narasimha is often depicted with three eyes, and is described in Vaishnavism to be the God of Destruction; he who destroys the entire universe at the time of the great dissolution (Mahapralaya). Hence, he is known as Kala (time) or Mahakala (great-time), or Parakala (beyond time) in his epithets. There exists a matha (monastery) dedicated to him by the name of Parakala Matha in the Sri Vaishnava tradition. Narasimha is also described as the God of Yoga, in the form of Yoga-Narasimha.

Narasimha iconography shows him with a human torso and lower body, with a leonine face and claws, typically with the asura Hiranyakashipu in his lap, whom he is in the process of defeating. The asura king was the powerful brother of the evil Hiranyaksha, who had been previously defeated by Vishnu, and thus hated the latter. Hiranyakashipu gained a boon from Brahma due to which he could not be killed during the day or night, inside or outside the house; neither in the sky nor on land nor in Svarga nor in Patala, by any weapon, nor by a man, deva, asura, or an animal. Endowed with this boon, he began to wreak chaos and havoc, persecuting all the devotees of Vishnu, including his own son. Vishnu, cognisant of the asura's boon, creatively assumed a hybrid form that was neither man nor animal, and slew the wicked king at the junction of day and night, at the threshold of his house, which was neither inside nor the outside, upon his lap, and with his claws. Narasimha is known primarily as the 'Great Protector' who specifically defends and protects his devotees from evil. The most popular Narasimha myth is the legend of his protection of his devotee Prahlada, and the slaying of Prahlada's wicked father and tyrant, Hiranyakashipu.

Narasimha is one of the major deities in Vaishnavism, and his legends are revered in Vaikhanasas, Sri Vaishnavism, Sadh Vaishnavism, and various other Vaishnava traditions of Hinduism. He is celebrated in many regional Hindu temples, texts, performance arts, and festivals such as the Hindu festival of colours of the spring, called Holi.

One of the earliest representation of Narasimha, dating back to the 4th-century CE, is from Kondamotu in Coastal Andhra. Other older known artworks of Narasimha have been found at several sites across Uttar Pradesh and Andhra Pradesh, such as at the Mathura archaeological site. These have been variously dated between the 2nd and the 4th century CE.

Etymology

In Sanskrit the word Narasimha consists of two words "nara" which means man, and "simha" which means lion, referring to a man-lion avatar of Vishnu. Additionally, the word "singh" is often used in place of "simha" which also means lion in Sanskrit and other Indian languages.

He is known as Nrisimha, Nrisingha, Narasingha, Narasingh, Narsingh, Narasimba and Narasinghar in derivative languages. His other names are Agnilochana (अग्निलोचन) – the one who has fiery eyes, Bhairavadambara (भैरवडम्बर) – the one who causes terror by roaring, Karala (कराल) – the one who has a wide mouth and projecting teeth, Hiranyakashipudvamsa (हिरण्यकशिपुध्वंस) – the one who killed Hiranyakashipu, Nakhastra (नखास्त्र) – the one for whom nails are his weapons, Sinhavadana (सिंहवदन) – the whose face is of lion and Mrigendra (मृगेन्द्र) – king of animals or lion.

Texts

Vedas
The Vishnu hymn 1.154 of the Rigveda (1700-1200 BCE) contains a verse with allusions to a "wild beast, dread, prowling, mountain-roaming", which has been interpreted by some to be the Narasiṃha legend. Another hymn 8.14 alludes to the Namuci legend with "waters' foam you tore off, Indra, the head of Namuci, subduing all contending hosts", but the hymns does not present details.

A more complete version of the Namuci legend is found in Shatapatha Brahmana (7th - 6th century BCE) of the Yajurveda in chapter 12.7.3.v Other references to Narasimha are found in the Vedic texts Vajaseneyi Samhita 10.34, Pancavimsa Brahmana 12.6.8 and Taittiriya Brahmana 1.7.1.6.

The Indra-Namuci legend
Narasimha likely has roots in the metaphor-filled Indra-Namuci legend in the Vedas. Indra is the dharmic leader of the Devas who commands lightning, thunder, rain and rivers, while Namuci is a deceptive demigod Asura in competition for power. Namuci suggests peace to Indra, which the latter accepts. He demands Indra to promise that he will neither try to slay him with his "palm of the hand nor with the fist", neither in day nor in night, neither "anything that is dry" nor "anything that is moist". Indra agrees.

After the deal is done, Namuci carries away all that nourishes the Devas: the Soma drink, the essence of food and the strength of Indra. The leader of the gods finds himself conflicted and feels bound by his promise. Indra then meets Saraswati (goddess of knowledge) and the Ashvins. They reply they will deal with Namuci, get it all back, if Indra agrees to share his powers, the essence of food and the Soma drink with them. Indra agrees. The gods and the goddess then come up with a creative plan. They pour out "foam of water" as a thunderbolt, which is neither dry nor moist, and the evil Asura Namuci is attacked and killed when it is neither day nor night.

After Namuci is killed, the gods get all the powers back, but discover that Namuci had drunk the Soma already. The good was thus now mixed with his badness of his blood, which they did not want to drink. So, they extract the good out from the bad. Thus, good returns to the Devas, the bad is discarded.

According to Deborah Soifer, the Vedic legend has many parallels with the Narasimha legend, it has the same plot, the same "neither-nor" constraints, and the same creative spirit that allows the good to vanquish the evil. Further, the Sanskrit words and phrasing such as "neither palm nor fist" and "neither day nor night" in the later Hindu texts is the same as in the Vedic texts. This suggests a link and continuity between the Vedic Namuci legend and the later Narasimha legend in the Puranas. According to Walter Ruben, both versions along with several other legends in ancient and medieval texts reflect the Indian tradition against despots and tyrants who abuse power.

Puranas
There are references to Narasiṃha in a variety of Purāṇas, with 17 different versions of the main narrative. The Valmiki Ramayana (7.24), Harivaṃśa (41 & 3.41-47), Viṣṇu Purāṇa (1.16-20), Bhagavata Purāṇa (Canto 7), Agni Purāṇa (4.2-3), Brahmāṇḍa Purāṇa(2.5.3-29), Vayu Purāṇa (67.61-66), Brahma-Purāṇa  (213.44-79), Viṣṇudharmottara Purāṇa(1.54), Kūrma Purāṇa (1.15.18-72), Matsya Purāṇa(161-163), Padma Purāṇa(Uttara-khaṇḍa 5.42), Śiva Purāṇa (2.5.43 & 3.10-12), Linga Purana (1.95-96) and Skanda Purāṇa 7 (2.18.60-130) all contain depictions of the Narasiṃha Avatāra. In all these Puranas, Narasimha is described as the God of Destruction, who does destruction at the time of Pralaya or Yuganta and described as Kala. Narasimha is also described as having three eyes just like Shiva and does destruction with fire coming from his third eye.

Other texts
Narasimha is also found and is the focus of Nrisimha Tapaniya Upanishad.

History

Prahlāda legend

The Bhagavata Purāṇa describes that Vishnu, in his previous avatar as Varāha, killed the evil asura Hiraṇayakṣa. The older brother of Hirṇayakṣa, demon king Hiraṇyakaśipu, hated Vishnu and wanted revenge. He undertook many years of austere penance to gain special powers. Thereafter, Brahma offered Hiraṇyakaśipu a boon. Hiraṇyakaśipu asked, "Grant me that I not die within any residence or outside any residence, during the daytime or at night, nor on the ground or in the sky. Grant me that my death not be brought about by any weapon, nor by any human being or animal. Grant me that I not meet death from any entity, living or nonliving created by you. Grant me, further, that I not be killed by any demigod or demon or by any great snake from the lower planets." Brahma granted him the boon, and Hiraṇyakaśipu gained these powers.

Hiraṇyakaśipu, once powerful and invincible with the new boon, began to persecute those who were devotees of Vishnu. Hiraṇyakaśipu had a son, Prahlāda, who disagreed and rebelled against his father. Prahlāda became a devotee of Vishnu. This angered Hiraṇyakaśipu, who tried to kill the boy—but with each attempt, Prahlāda was protected by Viṣṇu's mystical power. When asked, Prahlāda refused to acknowledge his father as the supreme lord of the universe and claimed that Viṣṇu is all-pervading and omnipresent.

Hiraṇyakaśipu pointed to a nearby pillar and asked if 'his Viṣṇu' is in it and said to his son Prahlāda, "O most unfortunate Prahlāda, you have always described a supreme being other than me, a supreme being who is above everything, who is the controller of everyone, and who is all-pervading. But where is He? If He is everywhere, then why is He not present before me in this pillar?" Prahlāda then answered, "He was, He is and He will be."

In an alternate version of the story, Prahlāda answered,He is in pillars, and he is in the smallest twig.
Hiraṇyakaśipu, unable to control his anger, smashed the pillar with his mace, and following a tumultuous sound, Viṣṇu in the form of Narasiṃha appeared from it and moved to attack Hiraṇyakaśipu in defense of Prahlāda. In order to kill Hiraṇyakaśipu and not upset the boon given by Brahma, the form of Narasiṃha was chosen. Hiraṇyakaśipu could not be killed by human, deva or animal. Narasiṃha was none of these, as he is a form of Viṣṇu incarnate as a part-human, part-animal.  He came upon Hiraṇyakaśipu at twilight (when it is neither day nor night) on the threshold of a courtyard (neither indoors nor out), and put the demon on his thighs (neither earth nor space). Using his sharp fingernails (neither animate nor inanimate) as weapons, he disemboweled and killed the demon king.

Narasimha was in rage and seeing this, Lord Brahma sent Prahlad to pacify him. Prahlad sang hymns and the 'Ugra' Narasimha now became peaceful 'Soumya' or 'Shant' Narasimha.

The Kūrma Purāṇa describes the preceding battle between the Puruṣa and demonic forces in which he escapes a powerful weapon called Paśupāta. According to Soifer, it describes how Prahlāda's brothers headed by Anuhrāda and thousands of other demons "were led to the valley of death (yamalayam) by the lion produced from the body of man-lion". The same episode occurs in the Matsya Purāṇa 179, several chapters after its version of the Narasiṃha advent.

Shaiva legends
In an alternate version, the Shaiva scriptures narrate that god Shiva assumed the Avatar (incarnation) of Sharabha to pacify Narasimha afterwards when he started to threaten the world violently.The Shiva Purana mentions: After slaying Hiranyakashipu, Narasimha's wrath threatened the world. At the behest of the gods, Shiva sent Virabhadra to tackle Narasimha. When that failed, Shiva manifested as Sharabha. Sharabha then attacked Narasimha, defeated and immobilized him. Narasimha then brought forth Gandaberunda, for which Lord Sarabeshwara released goddess Pratyangira from one of his wings while goddess Shoolini being the other wing. The Gandabherunda destroyed the form of Goddess , while Narasimha pacified Shiva. Adi Shankaracharya refutes the sectarian Sharabha story and refers to this as 356th name of Vishnu Sahasranama as not mentioning the lion-killing animal at all and instead interprets the name to mean, "As the Lord shines in the body as the indwelling Self, He is called Sharabha, while the body is sara (perishable)."

Iconography

Narasimha is always shown with a lion face with clawed fingers fused with a human body. Sometimes he is coming out of a pillar signifying that he is everywhere, in everything, in everyone. Some temples such as at Ahobilam, Andhra Pradesh, the iconography is more extensive, and includes nine other icons of Narasimha:
Prahladavarada: blessing Prahlada
Yogānanda-narasiṃha: serene, peaceful Narasimha teaching yoga
Guha-narasiṃha: concealed Narasimha
Krodha-narasiṃha: angry Narasimha
Vira-narasimha: warrior Narasimha
Malola-narasiṃha or Lakshmi-Narasimha: with Lakshmi, his wife
Jvala-narasiṃha: Narasimha emitting flames of wrath
Sarvatomukha-narasimha: many-faced Narasimha
Bhishana-narasimha: ferocious Narasimha
Bhadra-narasimha: another fierce aspect of Narasimha
Mrityormrityu-narasimha: defeater of death aspect of Narasimha

The earliest known iconography of Narasimha is variously dated to between the 2nd and the 4th-century CE, and these have been found in Uttar Pradesh, Madhya Pradesh and Andhra Pradesh. Most images and temples of Narasimha are found in the peninsular region of India, but important ancient and medieval archeological sites containing Narasimha icons are also found as Vaikuntha Chaturmurti in Kashmir and Khajuraho temples, while single face versions are found in Garhwa and Mathura (Uttar Pradesh) and in Ellora Caves (Maharashtra). Other major temples with notable icons of Narasimha are found in Himachal Pradesh, Madhya Pradesh, Maharashtra, Odisha, Andhra Pradesh, Tamil Nadu and the Vijayanagara Empire ruins in Karnataka. Some of the oldest surviving Hindu temples, such as those found in Tigawa and Eran (Madhya Pradesh), dated to early 5th-century, include Narasimha along with other avatars of Vishnu. The Thuravoor Temple is the most important shrine to Narasimha in Kerala; the form of Narasimha there is known as Vaṭakanappan.

Significance

Narasimha is a significant iconic symbol of creative resistance, hope against odds, victory over persecution, and destruction of evil. He is the destructor of not only external evil, but also one's own inner evil of "body, speech, and mind" states Pratapaditya Pal.

In South Indian art – sculptures, bronzes and paintings – Viṣṇu's incarnation as Narasiṃha is one of the most chosen themes and amongst Avatāras perhaps next only to Rāma and Kṛṣṇa in popularity.

Narasimha is worshipped across Telangana and Andhra Pradesh States in numerous forms. Although, it is common that each of the temples contain depictions of Narasimha in more than one form, Ahobilam contains nine temples of Narasimha dedicated to the nine forms of Narasimha. It is also notable that the central aspect of Narasimha incarnation is killing the demon Hiranyakasipu, but that image of Narasimha is not commonly worshipped in temples, although it is depicted.

Coins, inscriptions and terracotta
The Narasimha legend was influential by the 5th-century, when various Gupta Empire kings minted coins with his images or sponsored inscriptions that associated the ethos of Narasimha with their own. The kings thus legitimized their rule as someone like Narasimha who fights evil and persecution. Some of the coins of the Kushan era show Narasimha-like images, suggesting possible influence.

Some of the oldest Narasimha terracotta artworks have been dated to about the 2nd century CE, such as those discovered in Kausambi. A nearly complete, exquisitely carved standing Narasimha statue, wearing a pancha, with personified attributes near him has been found at the Mathura archeological site and is dated to the 6th century.

Performance arts
The Narasimha legends have been a part of various Indian classical dance repertoire. For example, Kathakali theatre has included the Narasimha-Hiranyakasipu battle storyline, and adaptations of Prahlada Caritam with Narasimha has been one of the popular performances in Kerala. Similarly, the Bhagavata Mela dance-drama performance arts of Tamil Nadu traditionally celebrate the annual Narasimha jayanti festival by performing the story within regional Narasimha temples.

Prayers
A number of prayers have been written in dedication to Narasiṃha avatāra. These include:

 The Narasiṃha Mahā-Mantra
 Narasiṃha Praṇāma Prayer
 Daśāvatāra Stotra by Jayadeva
 Kāmaśikha Aṣṭakam by Vedānta Deśika
 Divya Prabandham 2954
 Sri Lakshmi Narasimha Karavalamba Stotram by Adi Shankaracharya

Early images

In Andhra Pradesh, a panel dating to third-fourth century AD shows a full theriomorphic squatting lion with two extra human arms behind his shoulders holding Vaiṣṇava emblems. This lion, flanked by five heroes (vīra), often has been identified as an early depiction of Narasiṃha. Standing cult images of Narasiṃha from the early Gupta period, survive from temples at Tigowa and Eran. These sculptures are two-armed, long maned, frontal, wearing only a lower garment, and with no demon-figure of Hiraṇyakaśipu. Images representing the narrative of Narasiṃha slaying the demon Hiraṇyakaśipu survive from slightly later Gupta-period temples: one at Madhia and one from a temple-doorway now set into the Kūrma-maṭha at Nachna, both dated to the late fifth or early sixth century A.D.

An image of Narasiṃha supposedly dating to second-third century AD sculpted at Mathura was acquired by the Philadelphia Museum of Art in 1987. It was described by Stella Kramrisch, the former Philadelphia Museum of Art's Indian curator, as "perhaps the earliest image of Narasiṃha as yet known". This figure depicts a furled brow, fangs, and lolling tongue similar to later images of Narasiṃha, but the idol's robe, simplicity, and stance set it apart. On Narasiṃha's chest under his upper garment appears the suggestion of an amulet, which Stella Kramrisch associated with Visnu's cognizance, the Kaustubha jewel. This upper garment flows over both shoulders; but below Hiranyakasipu, the demon-figure placed horizontally across Narasiṃha's body, a twisted waist-band suggests a separate garment covering the legs. The demon's hair streams behind him, cushioning his head against the man-lion's right knee. He wears a simple single strand of beads. His body seems relaxed, even pliant. His face is calm, with a slight suggestion of a smile. His eyes stare adoringly up at the face of Viṣṇu. There is little tension in this figure's legs or feet, even as Narasiṃha gently disembowels him. His innards spill along his right side. As the Matsya purana describes it, Narasiṃha ripped "apart the mighty Daitya chief as a plaiter of straw mats shreds his reeds". Based on the Gandhara-style of robe worn by the idol, Michael Meiste altered the date of the image to fourth century AD.

An image of Narasiṃha, dating to the 9th century, was found on the northern slope of Mount Ijo, at Prambanan, Indonesia. Images of Trivikrama and Varāha avatāras were also found at Prambanan, Indonesia. Viṣṇu and His avatāra images follow iconographic peculiarities characteristic of the art of central Java. This includes physiognomy of central Java, an exaggerated volume of garment, and some elaboration of the jewelry. This decorative scheme once formulated became, with very little modification, an accepted norm for sculptures throughout the Central Javanese period (circa 730–930 A.D.). Despite the iconographic peculiarities, the stylistic antecedents of the Java sculptures can be traced back to Indian carvings as the Chalukya and Pallava images of the 6th–7th centuries AD.

Pilgrimage sites

In India
 Yoganarasimha Temple, Devarayanadurga, Karnataka
 Yoga Narasimha Temple, Melukote, Karnataka
 Lakshmi Narasimha Temple, Mangalagiri, Andhra Pradesh
 Vedadri Narasimha Temple, Vedadri, Andhra Pradesh.
 Sreenivasakovil, Tripunithura, Kerala
 Prahlad Ghat, Hardoi, Uttar Pradesh
 Shri Laxmi Narsimha Temple, Maharashtra
 Varaha Lakshmi Narasimha temple, Simhachalam, Andhra Pradesh
 Iskcon (Hare Krishna) Golden Temple, Telangana
 Lakshmi Narasimha Temple, Yadadri, Telangana
 Narasimha Temple, Puri, Odisha
 Narasimha Temple, Bhubaneswar, Odisha
 Guru Narasimha Temple, Saligrama, Karnataka
 Narasingam Yoga Narasimha Perumal Temple, Tamil Nadu
 Narasimhaswamy Temple, Namakkal, Tamil Nadu
 Sri Lakshmi Narasimha Temple, Thalassery, Kerala
 Narsinghji Temple, Rajasthan
 Nrisingha Temple, Nadia, West Bengal
 Narasingha Jharna Cave Temple Bidar Karnataka

See also 
 Narasinha Avatar
 Narasimha Purana
 Narasimha Satakam
 Ramtek Kevala Narasimha temple inscription
 Kangla Sha
 Nongshaba

References

Bibliography

External links 

Iconography and Symbolism of Pañcamukha Narasimha, R. Kalidos (1987)
The story of Lord Narasimha

Avatars of Vishnu
Mythological human hybrids
Animal gods
Animals in Hinduism
Akilattirattu Ammanai
Ayyavazhi mythology
Lion deities